Chase or CHASE may refer to:

Businesses
 Chase Bank, a national American financial institution
 Chase Aircraft (1943–1954), a defunct American aircraft manufacturer
 Chase Coaches, a defunct bus operator in England
 Chase Corporation (1970s–1989), a defunct New Zealand property developer
 Chase Motor Truck Company (1907–1919), a defunct vehicle manufacturer
 Chase, a brand of bicycle made by Cannondale Bicycle Corporation

Fictional characters
Chase in the PAW Patrol animated TV series
 Dell "Chase" Brandstone, fictional boundary warden of The Sword of Truth  epic fantasy novels
Jennifer "Pilot" Chase, in the TV series Captain Power and the Soldiers of the Future

Film
 Chase (2010 film), an Indian film in Hindi
 Chase (2019 film), an American thriller
 Chase (2022 film), an Indian film in Kannada
 Chased (film), a 2011 British drama short

Music
 Chase (band), a jazz-rock fusion band of the 1970s
 Chase (Chase album)
 Chase (Djumbo album)
 "Chase" (L'Arc-en-Ciel song) (2011)
 "Chase" (Koda Kumi song)
 "Chase" (instrumental), a work by Giorgio Moroder
 "Chase", an opening theme for JoJo's Bizarre Adventure: Diamond Is Unbreakable
 Chase (The Boyz EP), 2020
 Chase (Minho EP), 2022

People
 Chase (given name)
 Chase (surname)

Places

Canada
 Chase, British Columbia, a village municipality in the Shuswap Country region
 Chase River, a river on Vancouver Island, British Columbia
 Chase River, Nanaimo, a community within the City of Nanaimo, British Columbia
 Chase Island, Nunavut

United States
 Chase, Alabama, an unincorporated community
 Chase, Alaska, a census-designated place
 Chase, Indiana, an unincorporated town
 Chase, Kansas, a city
 Chase County, Kansas
 Chase, Louisiana, an unincorporated community
 Chase, Maryland, an unincorporated community
 Chase, Pennsylvania, a census-designated place
 Chase City, Virginia, a town
 Chase, Wisconsin, a town
 Chase (community), Wisconsin, an unincorporated community
 Camp Chase, a Civil War staging, training and prison camp in Columbus, Ohio
 Chase County, Nebraska
 Chase Township, Michigan

Elsewhere
 Chase Line, a suburban railway line in the West Midlands, England
 Ku-ring-gai Chase National Park, a place in Australia
 Chase Vault, a burial vault in the cemetery of the Christ Church Parish Church, Barbados

Ships
 , a destroyer in the United States Navy
 , a destroyer escort of the United States Navy
 , a high-endurance cutter of the United States Coast Guard
 , a side-wheel steamer of the United States Revenue-Marine
 , a training ship of the United States Revenue Cutter Service

Sports
 Chase (racing) or steeplechase, a type of horse race which is run over fences
 Chase Field, a baseball stadium in Phoenix, Arizona
 Chase (cricket), when a team needs a certain number of runs to win

Technology
 Chase (algorithm), an algorithm in database construction, to test if a decomposition is lossless
 Chase (lighting), an effect in which light sources are lit up sequentially
 Chase (printing), a (metal) frame that is used to contain a printing forme

Television
 Chase (TV channel), a defunct Philippine television network
 Chase (1973 TV series), an NBC crime/adventure drama
 Chase (2008 TV series), a SyFy reality series
 Chase (2010 TV series), an NBC drama series
 "Chase" (House episode), an episode of House

Other uses
 Chase (land), a British geographical term designating an area of privately owned land for hunting
 Operation CHASE, a former United States Department of Defense program
 Chase (comics), a DC comic book
 Chase (novel), by Dean Koontz
 Children's Hospices Association for the South East, a former charity in England, now Shooting Star Children's Hospices

See also
 Chace (disambiguation)
 Chaise
 The Chase (disambiguation)
 Chase Brook (disambiguation)
 Chase Building (disambiguation)
 Repoussé and chasing